Nymphe was a 40-gun  frigate of the French Navy.

Career
On 7, they captured the corvette HMS Raven. On 17 February of the same year, Nymphe was with the 32-gun  when she captured the 44-gun . 

On 20 January 1785, Nymphe arrived at Brest, ferrying Lafayette. 

In July 1792, she was under Coëtnempren de Kerdournan. She then returned to Lorient and was put in the ordinary. 

In July 1793, Nymphe was brought into active again under Lieutenant Pitot to fight the Chouan royalist insurgency.

Fate 
On 30 December 1793, Nymphe was wrecked while battling Chouan coastal artillery near Noirmoutier.

Notes and references

References

Bibliography 
 

Ships built in France
Age of Sail frigates of France
1782 ships
Nymphe-class frigates
Maritime incidents in 1793